Mohamed Shahabuddeen (7 October 1931 – 17 February 2018) was a Guyanese politician and judge. He was judge of the International Court of Justice, judge and twice vice president of the Yugoslavia tribunal and arbitrator and judicial tribunal of the International Criminal Court.

Biography 
Shahabuddeen was born in Vreed-en-Hoop on 7 October 1931. He studied law at the University of London, where he returned several times in the course of his career. There he completed in 1953 his Bachelor of Laws. After that, he began his law practice in Guyana and studied at some point, which he completed with the title Master of Laws in 1958. In 1959 he passed the title Bachelor of Science in Economics. During his further career, he continued to study, which earned him the title Doctor of Philosophy in 1970, and in 1986 the title of Doctor of Laws.

Since 1959, he worked for the Guyanese government and in politics until 1962 as a lawyer of the crown, then until 1973 as Attorney General and thereafter as Attorney General until 1978. From 1978 to 1987 he was Minister of Justice and Acting Minister Of Foreign Affairs, and since 1983 he was Deputy Prime Minister and Vice President of Guyana.

From 1988 to 1997 he was a judge of the International Court of Justice in The Hague. Subsequently, he was judge and twice vice president of the Yugoslavia tribunal until 2009. In addition, he has been an arbiter in the International Criminal Court, also in The Hague since 1997, and the Center for International Arbitration in Cairo. In January 2009 he was chosen as a judge of the International Criminal Court, a function that would take place in March of that year. However, in February he served his resignation for personal reasons. He was a member of the Institut de Droit International from 1993.

Shahabuddeen died on 17 February 2018.

References

1931 births
2018 deaths
Vice presidents of Guyana
Government ministers of Guyana
People's National Congress (Guyana) politicians
20th-century Guyanese judges
International Court of Justice judges
Members of the Permanent Court of Arbitration
Attorneys General of Guyana
Guyanese judges of United Nations courts and tribunals
Guyanese judges of international courts and tribunals
People from Essequibo Islands-West Demerara
21st-century Guyanese judges